Azúcar pa' ti (Sugar for You) is a 1965 album recorded by Eddie Palmieri and released by Tico Records. The album was Palmieri's most successful album, and included one of his biggest songs, "Azucar", an 8-minute descarga-esque song. The album also included the original recording of "Oyelo que te conviene", which was later recorded on his 1974 album Sun of Latin Music along with lead vocalist Lalo Rodríguez.

In 2009, the album was added to the United States National Recording Registry by the Library of Congress for being "culturally, aesthetically, or historically significant".

Track listing

References 

1965 albums
Eddie Palmieri albums
Tico Records albums
United States National Recording Registry albums